Berus is a village in the municipality of Überherrn in the district of Saarlouis, Saarland, southwestern Germany. Until December 1973, Berus was a municipality of its own.

Geographic position 
The old centre of the village is situated on a spur of the Saargau overlooking the Saar valley, on the very border to Lorraine (France). The highest position is on 377 m absolute altitude. (Sauberg/French broadcast station Europe 1)

Former municipalities in Saarland
Villages in Saarland